The Journal of Organic Chemistry,  colloquially known as JOC, is a peer-reviewed scientific journal for original contributions of fundamental research in all branches of theory and practice in organic and bioorganic chemistry.  It is published by the publishing arm of the American Chemical Society, with 24 issues per year.  According to the Journal Citation Reports, the journal had a 2017 impact factor of 4.805 and it is the journal that received the most cites (100,091 in 2017) in the field of organic chemistry.  According to Web of Knowledge (and as December 2012), eleven papers from the journal have received more than 1,000 citations, with the most cited paper having received 7,967 citations.  The current editor-in-chief is Scott J. Miller from Yale University.

Indexing
J. Org. Chem. is currently indexed in:

See also
Organic Letters
Organometallics

References

External links

American Chemical Society academic journals
English-language journals
Publications established in 1936
Biweekly journals
1936 establishments in the United States
Organic chemistry journals